"Welcome to Winfield" is the first segment of the seventeenth episode from the first season (1985–86) of the American television series The Twilight Zone. In this segment, an agent of death pursues his latest assignment to a town inhabited by people who have cheated death.

Plot
Matt, a young man in a hospital in critical condition, senses death coming for him. He frantically wakes up and begs his girlfriend Mamie to save him. She takes Matt from the hospital and drives him to a dusty old town called Winfield which appears to be a throwback to the Old West.

A man in white, Griffin St. George, finds Matt missing from his hospital bed and tracks them to Winfield. He tells the townspeople he is in the "reclamation" business. They change the flat tire on St. George's car and confirm for him that Winfield does not appear on the map. Matt and Mamie, who are now married, hide out in the hotel. St. George intends to move on in his search, until one of the townspeople, Weldon, mentions that he is 150 years old and that "a young pup" is living in the town. The townspeople hustle Weldon away and hang him up on a coat rack to keep him from blabbing further. However, Weldon slips off his hook and St. George drives him away from the pursuing townspeople so he can question him about his remarks. Weldon reveals that St. George's predecessor, Chin Du Long, was assigned to end the lives of all the town residents but abrogated his duty for sentimental reasons. St. George is unsurprised, noting that Du Long was reassigned to a different job due to a number of such infractions.

St. George goes back to town in order to collect Matt and all the townspeople. He finds Matt ready to surrender if St. George leaves the townspeople alone, yet the townspeople are also ready to sacrifice themselves to save Matt. St. George decides to leave both Matt and the townspeople alone, saying he will report that he was unable to find Matt and will not return to Winfield for at least a century. As St. George drives away, he talks to Du Long on the carphone, assuring him that no one will discover their secret since Winfield does not appear on maps.

External links
 
 Postcards from the Zone episode 1.42 Welcome to Winfield

1986 American television episodes
The Twilight Zone (1985 TV series season 1) episodes
Television episodes about personifications of death

fr:Bienvenue à Winfield